Werdinsel, also known as Limmatauen Werdhölzli, is an island and protected area in the Limmat in Switzerland.

Geography 
Located in the former independent municipality of Höngg, today the river island is a popular recreation area, public park and bath in the Limmat, situated in the northernly suburban area of the Limmat Valley in Zürich.

Recreation 
The so-called Flussbad Au-Höngg is one of the four public river baths situated in the Limmat within the city of Zürich. The entrance is free, but there is just a limited infrastructure. The Zürich tram line 17 (stop Tüffenwies) and the local Verkehrsbetriebe Zürich VBZ bus lines 80 and 89 (stop Winzerhalde) provide public transportation. The island also houses a restaurant and grill stations, family gardens, sand beaches and a forested area, the adjoint Limmat-Auen Werdhölzli protected area.

For decades, the river island has been called a 'conflict zone' related to its public use; so claim those with dogs, naturists and LGBT enthusiasts, as well as textiles (non-nudists) and families in the area. Another problem is the intensive use, so on peak days, up to 4,500 visitors search for recreation, almost half a million a year, among them also people from neighboring cantons, and therefore causing additional road transport traffic. The city police, however, legally allows any people to roam freely naked in public, and even outdoor sex is not illegal as long as no one raise indictment. The city police forces regularly patrols on the ground, and the municipal authorities started to assign beware of the naked signs in August 2015.

Limmatauen 
Limmatauen Werdhölzli is a protected forest and river area, partially situated in the municipality of Oberengstringen, between the weir at the Höngg power plant, resulting in a more than 130 years old flood protection plan between two neighbored municipalities. In cooperation with the Canton of Zurich, the municipalities of Oberengstringen and Zürich, that section of the river was renewed to September 2013. In addition to improved access to the Limmat and the hiking path towards the Fahr Abbey, the area was widened for pedestrians and cyclists. Along the ridge there are installed bat boxes in the trees. After nearly a year of construction, the project was officially presented to the public on 20 September 2013. The costs of 9.4 million Swiss Francs, are provided by the city and cantonal government, and some companies in collaboration with the World Wildlife Fund Switzerland, which claims the place as very important to our rivers and streams, so that they can create their very structure.

Cultural heritage 
A watermill of the Wettingen Abbey was first mentioned in 1365. The island is a historical site of water industrialization in Zürich, and also houses the former spinning mill Strickler, as well as the Kraftwerk Werd, one of the oldest power plants in Zürich. Werd is an old term used in German language for a river island, and Au is meaning a small forest at a body of water. The sites are listed in the Swiss inventory of cultural property of national and regional significance.

Trivia 
As in Switzerland, both burials and cremations are permitted by law, the island (or, rather, the river) is also used for flow burials.

References

External links 

 Limmat-Auenpark Werdhölzli on the website of the city of Zürich 

River islands of Switzerland
Geography of Zürich
Buildings and structures in Zürich
Limmat
Parks in Zürich
Protected areas of Switzerland
1945 establishments in Switzerland
2013 establishments in Switzerland